The Liberal Democratic Centre (CDL) was a liberal political party in Spain.

It was launched in February 2006 and was led by Manuel Alonso, a former leading member of the Union of the Democratic Centre (UCD) and the Democratic and Social Centre (CDS). The party was closely linked with the British Liberal Democrats and became a full member of the European Liberal Democrat and Reform Party. It became an observer on 17 April 2009.

In February 2014, almost 88% of the members voted to merge the party with Citizens – Party of the Citizenry.

Leadership
President: Víctor Manuel Sarto Lorén (2006–2008), Manuel Alonso (2008–2009)
President: Sean O´Curneen Cañas (2009–2014)

References

External links

Liberal parties in Spain
Centrist parties in Spain
Defunct liberal political parties
2006 establishments in Spain
2014 disestablishments in Spain
Political parties established in 2006
Political parties disestablished in 2014